William  "Bill"  McGinley is the former White House Cabinet secretary in the administration of U.S. president Donald Trump.  He is an American lawyer and a former partner at the law firm Jones Day where he represented federal office holders, candidates, and national organizations on campaign finance, ethics, and other political law matters.

Biography
McGinley received his Bachelor of Arts degree in history from the University of California at Los Angeles and his Master of Arts degree in history from California State University at Long Beach.  He received his Juris Doctor degree from George Washington University Law School in 1997.

Following law school, McGinley served as Deputy General Counsel to the Republican National Committee (RNC) and was counsel to the Standing Committee on Rules of the RNC. He also served as general counsel to the National Republican Senatorial Committee.

McGinley worked for the law firm Patton Boggs where he became a partner and co-chair of the Election Law Practice Group.  Afterwards, he became a partner at Jones Day.

McGinley was counsel to the Convention Rules Committee of the 2012 Republican National Convention. During the convention he pushed the credentials committee to replace 10 Maine delegates for Ron Paul with 10 who supported Mitt Romney.

McGinley was hired by the Donald Trump presidential campaign in April 2016. He was expected to act as a campaign advisor during the delegate selection battles and on potential challenges to the credentials of 2016 Republican National Convention delegates.

After the election, McGinley was appointed White House Cabinet secretary and began work on January 20, 2017. He resigned in July 2019, and he subsequently joined The Vogel Group.

References

Year of birth missing (living people)
Living people
University of California, Los Angeles alumni
California State University, Long Beach alumni
George Washington University Law School alumni
Jones Day people
American lawyers
Trump administration personnel